Walhalla was a railway station on the Walhalla narrow gauge line in Gippsland, Victoria, Australia. The station was originally built to serve the Gold Mine town of Walhalla, however just 3 years after the line opened the last gold mine in the town closed.

This section of the railway was considered to be a remarkable piece of engineering; the town of Walhalla is located in a very steep gully, and due to space restrictions the station building was built over the creek. Shortly before the closure of the station, the station building was relocated to the Melbourne suburban station of Hartwell.

Victoria (Australia) tourist railway stations
Transport in Gippsland (region)
Shire of Baw Baw
Walhalla railway line